Minoxidil is a medication used for the treatment of high blood pressure and pattern hair loss. It is an antihypertensive vasodilator. It is available as a generic medication by prescription in oral tablet form and over the counter as a topical liquid or foam.

Medical uses
Minoxidil, when used for hypertension, is generally reserved for use in severe hypertension patients who can not respond to at least two agents and a diuretic. Minoxidil is also generally administered with a loop diuretic to prevent sodium and potassium retention. It may also cause a reflex tachycardia and thus is prescribed with a beta blocker.

Hair loss 
Minoxidil, applied topically, is used for the treatment of hair loss. It is effective in helping promote hair growth in people with androgenic alopecia regardless of sex. Minoxidil must be used indefinitely for continued support of existing hair follicles and the maintenance of any experienced hair regrowth.

Low-dose oral minoxidil (LDOM) is used off-label against hair loss and to promote hair regrowth. Oral minoxidil has been found to be an effective and well-tolerated treatment alternative for patients having difficulty with topical formulations.

Side effects

Topically applied minoxidil is generally well tolerated, but common side effects include itching of the eye, itching, irritation at the treated area, and unwanted hair growth elsewhere on the body.

Alcohol and propylene glycol present in some topical preparations may dry the scalp, resulting in dandruff and contact dermatitis.

Side effects of oral minoxidil may include swelling of the face and extremities, rapid heartbeat, or lightheadedness. Cardiac lesions, such as focal necrosis of the papillary muscle and subendocardial areas of the left ventricle, have been observed in laboratory animals treated with minoxidil. Pseudoacromegaly is an extremely rare side effect reported with large doses of oral minoxidil.

In 2013 or 2014 a seven-year-old girl was admitted to a children's hospital in Toulouse in France after accidentally ingesting a teaspoon of Alopexy (a brand name for minoxidil in France). The child vomited constantly after ingestion and showed hypotension and tachycardia for 40 hours.  The authors of the report on the incident stressed that the product should be kept out of reach of children, and urged manufacturers to consider more secure child-resistant packaging.

Pharmacology

Mechanism of action
The mechanism by which minoxidil promotes hair growth is not fully understood. Minoxidil is an adenosine 5'-triphosphate-sensitive potassium channel opener, causing hyperpolarization of cell membranes. Theoretically, by widening blood vessels and opening potassium channels, it allows more oxygen, blood, and nutrients to the follicles. Moreover, minoxidil contains a nitric oxide moiety and may act as a nitric oxide agonist. This may cause follicles in the telogen phase to shed, which are then replaced by thicker hairs in a new anagen phase. Minoxidil is a prodrug that is converted by sulfation via the sulfotransferase enzyme SULT1A1 to its active form, minoxidil sulfate. The effect of minoxidil is mediated by adenosine, which triggers intracellular signal transduction via both adenosine A1 receptors and two sub-types of adenosine A2 receptors (A2A and A2B receptors). Minoxidil acts as an activator of the Kir6/SUR2 channel upon selective binding to SUR2. The expression of SUR2B in dermal papilla cells might play a role in the production of adenosine. Minoxidil induces cell growth factors such as VEGF, HGF, IGF-1 and potentiates HGF and IGF-1 actions by the activation of uncoupled sulfonylurea receptor on the plasma membrane of dermal papilla cells.

A number of in vitro effects of minoxidil have been described in monocultures of various skin and hair follicle cell types including stimulation of cell proliferation, inhibition of collagen synthesis, and stimulation of vascular endothelial growth factor, prostaglandin synthesis and leukotriene B4 expression.

Minoxidil causes a redistribution of cellular iron through its apparent capacity to bind this metal ion. By binding iron in a Fenton-reactive form, intracellular hydroxyl radical production would ensue, but hydroxyl would be immediately trapped and scavenged by the minoxidil to generate a nitroxyl radical. It is presumed that this nitroxyl radical will be capable of reduction by glutathione to reform minoxidil. Such a process would cycle until the minoxidil is otherwise metabolized and would result in rapid glutathione depletion with glutathione disulphide formation and therefore with concomitant consumption of NADPH/ NADH and other reducing equivalents. Minoxidil inhibited PHD by interfering with the normal function of ascorbate, a cofactor of the enzyme, leading to a stabilization of HIF-1α protein and a subsequent activation of HIF-1. In an in vivo angiogenesis assay, millimolar minoxidil increased blood vessel formation in a VEGF-dependent manner. Minoxidil inhibition of PHD occurs via interrupting ascorbate binding to iron. The structural feature of positioning amines adjacent to nitric oxide may confer the ability of millimolar minoxidil to chelate iron, thereby inhibiting PHD. Minoxidil is capable of tetrahydrobiopterin inhibition as a cofactor for nitric oxide synthase.

Minoxidil stimulates prostaglandin E2 production by activating COX-1 and prostaglandin endoperoxide synthase-1 but inhibits prostacyclin production. Additionally, expression of the prostaglandin E2 receptor, the most upregulated target gene in the β-catenin pathway of DP cells, was enhanced by minoxidil, which may enable hair follicles to grow continuously and maintain the anagen phase.

Due to anti-fibrotic activity of minoxidil inhibition of enzyme lysyl hydroxylase present in fibroblast may result in synthesis of a hydroxylysine-deficient collagen. Minoxidil can also potentially stimulate elastogenesis in aortic smooth muscle cells, and in skin fibroblasts in a dose-dependent manner. In hypertensive rats, minoxidil increases elastin level in the mesenteric, abdominal, and renal arteries by a decrease in "elastase" enzyme activity in these tissues. In rats, potassium channel openers decrease calcium influx which inhibits elastin gene transcription through extracellular signal-regulated kinase 1/2 (ERK 1/2)-activator protein 1 signaling pathway. ERK 1/2 increases, through elastin gene transcription, adequately cross-linked elastic fiber content synthesized by smooth muscle cells, and decreases the number of cells in the aorta.

Minoxidil possesses alpha 2-adrenoceptor agonist activity, stimulates the peripheral sympathetic nervous system (SNS) by way of carotid and aortic baroreceptor reflexes. Minoxidil administration also brings an increase in plasma renin activity, largely due to the aforementioned activation of the SNS. This activation of the renin-angiotensin axis further prompts increased biosynthesis of aldosterone; whereas plasma and urinary aldosterone levels are increased early in the course of treatment with minoxidil, over time these values tend to normalize presumably because of accelerated metabolic clearance of aldosterone in association with hepatic vasodilation.

Minoxidil may be involved in the inhibition of serotonergic (5-HT2) receptors.

Minoxidil might increase blood-tumor barrier permeability in a time-dependent manner by down-regulating tight junction protein expression and this effect could be related to ROS/RhoA/PI3K/PKB signal pathway. Minoxidil significantly increases ROS concentration when compared to untreated cells.

In vitro Minoxidil treatment resulted in a 0.22 fold change for 5α-R2 (p < 0.0001). This antiandrogenic effect of minoxidil, shown by significant downregulation of 5α-R2 gene expression in HaCaT cells, may be one of its mechanisms of action in alopecia.

Minoxidil is less effective when the area of hair loss is large. In addition, its effectiveness has largely been demonstrated in younger men who have experienced hair loss for less than 5 years. Minoxidil use is indicated for central (vertex) hair loss only. Two clinical studies are being conducted in the US for a medical device that may allow patients to determine if they are likely to benefit from minoxidil therapy.

Conditions such as Cantú syndrome have been shown to mimic the pharmacological properties of minoxidil.

Chemistry
Minoxidil is an odorless, white to off-white, crystalline powder (crystals from methanol-acetonitrile). When heated to decomposition it emits toxic fumes of nitrogen oxides. It decomposes at 259-261 °C.

Solubility (mg/ml): propylene glycol 75, methanol 44, ethanol 29, 2-propanol 6.7, dimethylsulfoxide 6.5, water 2.2, chloroform 0.5, acetone <0.5, ethyl acetate <0.5, diethyl ether <0.5, benzene <0.5, acetonitrile <0.5.

 4.61

Commercially available minoxidil topical solution should be stored at a temperature of 20-25 °C. Extemporaneous formulations of minoxidil have been reported to have variable stability, depending on the vehicle and method of preparation, and the FDA requests that physicians and pharmacists refrain from preparing extemporaneous topical formulations using commercially available minoxidil tablets. Minoxidil tablets should be stored in well-closed containers at 15-30 °C.

Minoxidil, 6-amino-1,2-dihydro-1-hydroxy-2-imino-4-piperidinopyrimidine, is synthesized from barbituric acid, the reaction of which with phosphorus oxychloride gives 2,4,6-trichloropyrimidine. Upon reaction with ammonium, this turns into 2,4-diamino-6-chloropyrimidine. Next, the resulting 2,4-diamino-6-chloropyrimidine undergoes reaction with 2,4-dichlorophenol in the presence of potassium hydroxide, giving 2,4-diamino-6-(2,4-dichlorophenoxy)-pyrimidine. Oxidation of this product with 3-chloroperbenzoic acid gives 2,4-diamino-6-(2,4-dichlorophenoxy)pyrimidine-3-oxide, the 2,4-dichlorophenoxyl group of which is replaced with a piperidine group at high temperature, giving minoxidil.

Another synthesis approach is depicted here:

Compounds related to minoxidil include kopexil (diaminopyrimidine oxide).

History

Initial application
Minoxidil was developed in the late 1950s by the Upjohn Company (later became part of Pfizer) to treat ulcers. In trials using dogs, the compound did not cure ulcers, but proved to be a powerful vasodilator. Upjohn synthesized over 200 variations of the compound, including the one it developed in 1963 and named minoxidil. These studies resulted in the U.S. Food and Drug Administration (FDA) approving minoxidil (with the brand name 'Loniten') in the form of oral tablets to treat high blood pressure in 1979.

Hair growth
When Upjohn received permission from the U.S. Food and Drug Administration (FDA) to test the new drug as medicine for hypertension they approached Charles A. Chidsey MD, Associate Professor of Medicine at the University of Colorado School of Medicine. He conducted two studies, the second study showing unexpected hair growth. Puzzled by this side-effect, Chidsey consulted Guinter Kahn (who while a dermatology resident at the University of Miami had been the first to observe and report hair development on patients using the minoxidil patch) and discussed the possibility of using minoxidil  for treating hair loss.

Kahn along with his colleague Paul J. Grant MD had obtained a certain amount of the drug and conducted their own research, since they were first to make the side effect observation.  Neither Upjohn or Chidsey at the time were aware of the side effect of hair growth. The two doctors had been experimenting with a 1% solution of minoxidil mixed with several alcohol-based liquids.   Both parties filed patents to use the drug for hair loss prevention, which resulted in a decade-long trial between Kahn and Upjohn, which ended with Kahn's name included in a consolidated patent (U.S. #4,596,812 Charles A Chidsey, III and Guinter Kahn) in 1986 and royalties from the company to both Kahn and Grant.

Meanwhile, the effect of minoxidil on hair loss prevention was so clear that in the 1980s physicians were prescribing Loniten off-label to their balding patients.

In August 1988, the FDA approved the drug for treating baldness in men under the brand name "Rogaine" (FDA rejected Upjohn's first choice, Regain, as misleading). The agency concluded that although "the product will not work for everyone", 39% of the men studied had "moderate to dense hair growth on the crown of the head". "Men's Rogaine", marketed by Johnson & Johnson went off-patent on 20 January 2006.

In 1991, Upjohn made the product available for women. "Women's Rogaine", marketed by Johnson & Johnson went off-patent on 14 February 2014.

Society and culture

Economics 
In February 1996, the FDA approved both the over-the-counter sale of the medication and the production of generic formulations of minoxidil. Upjohn replied to that by lowering prices to half the price of the prescription drug and by releasing a prescription 5% formula of Rogaine in 1997. In 1998, a 5% formulation of minoxidil was approved for nonprescription sale by the FDA. The 5% aerosol foam formula was approved for medical use in the US in 2006. The generic versions of the 5% aerosol foam formula were approved in 2017.

In 2017, JAMA published a study of pharmacy prices in four states for 41 over-the-counter minoxidil products which were "gender-specified." The authors found that the mean price for minoxidil solutions was the same for women and men even though the women's formulations were 2% and the men's were 5%, while the mean price for minoxidil foams, which were all 5%, was 40% higher for women. The authors noted this was the first time gender-based pricing had been shown for a medication.

Brand names
, Minoxidil was marketed under many trade names worldwide: Alomax, Alopek, Alopexy, Alorexyl, Alostil, Aloxid, Aloxidil, Anagen, Apo-Gain, Axelan, Belohair, Boots Hair Loss Treatment, Botafex, Capillus, Carexidil, Coverit, Da Fei Xin, Dilaine, Dinaxcinco, Dinaxil, Ebersedin, Eminox, Folcare, Guayaten, Hair Grow, Hair-Treat, Hairgain, Hairgaine, Hairgrow, Hairway, Headway, Inoxi, Ivix, Keranique, Lacovin, Locemix, Loniten, Lonnoten, Lonolox, Lonoten, Loxon, M E Medic, Maev-Medic, Mandi, Manoxidil, Mantai, Men's Rogaine, Minodil, Minodril, Minostyl, Minovital, Minox, Minoxi, Minoxidil, Minoxidilum, Minoximen, Minoxiten, Minscalp, Mintop, Modil, Morr, Moxidil, Neo-Pruristam, Neocapil, Neoxidil, Nherea, Noxidil, Oxofenil, Pilfud, Pilogro, Pilomin, Piloxidil,Re-Stim, Re-Stim+, Recrea, Regain, Regaine, Regaxidil, Regro, Regroe, Regrou, Regrowth, Relive, Renobell Locion, Reten, Rexidil, Rogaine, Rogan, Si Bi Shen, Splendora, Superminox, Trefostil, Tricolocion, Tricoplus, Tricovivax, Tricoxane, Trugain, Tugain, Unipexil, Vaxdil, Vius, Women's Regaine, Xenogrow, Xtreme Boost, Xtreme Boost+, Xue Rui, Ylox, and Zeldilon.  It was also marketed as combination drug with amifampridine under the brand names Gainehair and Hair 4 U, and as a combination with tretinoin and clobetasol under the brand name Sistema GB.

Veterinary uses
Minoxidil is suspected to be highly toxic to cats, even in small doses, as there are reported cases of cats dying shortly after coming in contact with minimal amounts of the substance.

References

External links 
 
 

Amine oxides
Aminopyrimidines
Antihypertensive agents
Hair loss medications
1-Piperidinyl compounds
Potassium channel openers
Prodrugs
Vasodilators